George "Wingy" Johnston (July 30, 1920 – April 20, 2006) was a Canadian professional hockey right winger who played four seasons in the National Hockey League for the Chicago Blackhawks.

Early life 
Johnston was born in the St. Charles parish of Winnipeg, Manitoba. He played minor league hockey with the Saskatoon Quakers.

Career 
Johnston began his professional career with the Providence Reds of the American Hockey League in 1940. He was a member of the Kansas City Americans before joining the Chicago Blackhawks at the start of the 1941 season. Johnston played for the Kansas City Pla-Mors before rejoining the Blackhawks in 1945. After leaving the NHL, he was a member of the New Haven Ramblers, Tacoma Rockets, and Spokane Flyers.

References

External links
 

1920 births
2006 deaths
Canadian ice hockey forwards
Chicago Blackhawks players
Cleveland Barons (1937–1973) players
Ice hockey people from Winnipeg
New Haven Ramblers players
Providence Reds players
Canadian expatriate ice hockey players in the United States